WECC may refer to:

WECC-FM, a radio station (89.3 FM) licensed to Folkston, Georgia, United States
Western Electricity Coordinating Council
World Electronic Circuits Council